Chong-Aryk is a village in Jalal-Abad Region of Kyrgyzstan. It is part of the Toktogul District. Its population was 3,523 in 2021. It lies near the northwestern end of the Toktogul Reservoir.

References

Populated places in Jalal-Abad Region